Mostafa Soltan (born 2 February 1992), sometimes spelled Mostafa Sultan, is an Egyptian professional footballer who plays as a winger for Egyptian Premier League club Al Masry.

References

1992 births
Living people
People from Monufia Governorate
Egyptian footballers
Association football wingers
Egyptian Premier League players
El Shams SC players
FC Masr players
Al Masry SC players